Emilio Damián Martínez (born 10 April 1981 in Concepción) is a Paraguayan former footballer. He last played for Club Sport Colombia in Paraguay.

Martinez was part of Paraguay's silver medal-winning team at the 2004 Olympics. He was red-carded in the gold medal match.

International career
On 4 August, before the Summer Olympics began, he played in a preparation game against the Portugal of Cristiano Ronaldo in the city of Algarve, resulting in a 5–0 defeat.

References

1981 births
Living people
People from Concepción, Paraguay
Paraguayan footballers
Association football defenders
Paraguayan Primera División players
Club Nacional footballers
Cerro Porteño players
Club Olimpia footballers
Club Libertad footballers
Tigres UANL footballers
Santos Laguna footballers
Club Bolívar players
C.D. Universidad Católica del Ecuador footballers
Sport Colombia footballers
Expatriate footballers in Mexico
Expatriate footballers in Bolivia
Expatriate footballers in Ecuador
2004 Copa América players
Paraguay under-20 international footballers
Paraguay international footballers
Olympic footballers of Paraguay
Olympic silver medalists for Paraguay
Footballers at the 2004 Summer Olympics
Paraguayan expatriates in Bolivia
Olympic medalists in football
Medalists at the 2004 Summer Olympics